The 1974 Nobel Prize in Literature was awarded jointly to Swedish authors Eyvind Johnson (1900–1976) "for a narrative art, farseeing in lands and ages, in the service of freedom" and Harry Martinson (1904–1978) "for writings that catch the dewdrop and reflect the cosmos." The winners were announced in October 1974 by Karl Ragnar Gierow, permanent secretary of the Swedish Academy, and later sparked heavy criticisms from the literary world.

At the award ceremony on 10 December 1974, Karl Ragnar Gierow of the Swedish Academy said that Johnson and Martinson

It is the fourth (after 1904, 1917, and 1966), and as of yet last, occasion when the Nobel Prize in Literature has been shared between two individuals.

Laureates

Eyvind Johnson

Individual, moral, societal, and political issues are the recurring themes in Eyvind Johnson's literary works. De fyra främlingarna ("The Four Strangers"), a collection of short stories, served as his literary debut in 1924. Romanen om Olof ("The Novel about Olof"), his four autobiographical novels that appeared between 1934 and 1937, is regarded as one of his most important works. In the trilogy about Krilon (1941–1943), in which the world is represented allegorically, he took a strong stand against fascism and nazism of his day. His other famous works include Strändernas svall ("Return to Ithaca", 1946), Drömmar om rosor och eld ("Dreams of Roses and Fire", 1949), and Hans nådes tid ("The Days of His Grace", 1960).

Harry Martinson

The poetry and prose by Harry Martinson are both written in a unique and passionate style. His experiences as a young seaman and hobo, as well as his difficult and unloving childhood, are among the themes. He cares much about nature and is interested in science, which is reflected in his philosophical views and depictions of the natural world. Martinson's most well-known composition, the Aniara poetry collection from 1956, tells the story of a spaceship that departs from Earth following a horrific nuclear war but subsequently deviates from its intended path. His other notable works include Kap Farväl ("Cape Farewell", 1933), Nässlorna blomma ("Flowering Nettle", 1935), and Vägen till Klockrike ("The Road", 1948).

Nominations
Eyvind Johnson was first nominated for the prize in 1962 and then every year until 1971. During this period Johnson declined to be considered for the prize as he himself was a member of the Swedish Academy's Nobel committee (he resigned from the committee in 1972). Harry Martinson was first nominated in 1964. In the early 1970's Johnson and Martinson had been nominated individually for the prize by their colleague in the Swedish Academy, the 1951 Nobel Prize laureate Pär Lagerkvist. Academy and Nobel committee member Artur Lundkvist then strongly opposed that the Academy should award the Nobel prize to its own members. In his memoirs, Academy member Lars Gyllensten said that Johnson and Martinson had not been nominated by any member of the Academy in 1974 and justified the decision to award them, arguing that "The consequence of principally excluding members of the Academy as prize candidates would mean that the Academy could only elect second rate authors."

Reactions
The joint selection of Eyvind Johnson and Martinson for the Nobel Prize was very controversial as both were members of the Swedish Academy, the institution that awards the Nobel Prize in Literature. Graham Greene, Jorge Luis Borges, Saul Bellow (awarded in 1976) and Vladimir Nabokov were favourites to win the award that year.

The choice of Johnson and Martinson was heavily criticised by the press in their home country, mainly because the Swedish Academy awarded two of their own members. The most fierce critic, Sven Delblanc in Expressen, called it "a catastrophic decision" and said that the little credibility of the Nobel Prize in Literature that was left "would be wiped out with mockery, rolling around the world". He thought awarding the two academy members was a case of corruption: “There exists no strong international opinion advocating these authors. The choice reflects a lack of judgment by the academy. And lack of judgment in a serious context like this can only too easily be interpreted as corruption through camaraderie. Mutual admiration is one thing, but this smells almost like embezzlement.” The choices was also attacked by some other younger literature figures, saying the authors had written their best works too far back in time and that neither had won any international reputation. The well-known Swedish writer Karl Vennberg however said he favoured the prize: “I find that if I myself had a Nobel Prize to give, I would have been prepared to give Harry Martinson one as far back as 1932.”

Within the Swedish Academy, member Artur Lundkvist strongly opposed the prize decision and urged Johnson and Martinson to not accept the prize, thinking it would make them unhappy. Lundkvist later said he thought the award brought the authors to a too early death.

According to academy member Lars Gyllensten both authors were badly affected by the negativity and criticism following the award. The sensitive Martinson found it hard to cope with the criticism following his award, and died on 11February 1978 at the Karolinska University Hospital in Stockholm after cutting his stomach open with a pair of scissors in what has been described as a "hara-kiri-like manner".

Award ceremony
At the award ceremony on 10 December 1974 in Stockholm Concert Hall Eyvind Johnson and Harry Martinson received their awards. At the ceremony Alexander Solzhenitsyn also received his 1970 Nobel Prize in Literature, after finally having been allowed to leave the Soviet Union. Solzhenitsyn's presence was much noticed in the Swedish press.

References

External links
Award Ceremony speech nobelprize.org

1974
Harry Martinson